David Orme Tall (born 15 May 1941) is Emeritus Professor in Mathematical Thinking at the University of Warwick. One of his early influential works is the joint paper with Vinner "Concept image and concept definition in mathematics with particular reference to limits and continuity". The "concept image" is a notion in cognitive theory. It consists of all the cognitive structure in the individual's mind that is associated with a given concept. Tall and Vinner point out that the concept image may not be globally coherent, and may have aspects which are quite different from the formal concept definition. They study the development of limits and continuity, as taught in secondary school and university, from the cognitive viewpoint, and report on investigations which exhibit individual concept images differing from the formal theory, and containing factors which cause cognitive conflict.

Tall is also known within mathematics education for his longstanding collaboration with Eddie Gray. This partnership, based at the Mathematics Education Research Centre at the University of Warwick, resulted in the theoretically important notion of procept. Gray and Tall (1994) noted that mathematical symbolism often ambiguously refers to both process and concept, and that successful learners must be able to flexibly move between these different interpretations.

In recent years Tall has been working on what he calls 'three fundamentally different ways of operation' in mathematics, 'one through physical embodiment, including physical action and the use of visual and other senses, a second through the use of mathematical symbols that operate as process and concept (procepts) in arithmetic, algebra and symbolic calculus, and a third through formal mathematics in advanced mathematical thinking'. These three ways have become known as Tall’s Three Worlds of Mathematics: (conceptual) embodied; (operational) symbolic; and, (axiomatic) formal (see http://www.warwick.ac.uk/staff/David.Tall/themes/three-worlds.html).

In the book commissioned by the International Group for the Psychology of Mathematics Education to review mathematics education research between 1976–2006, Tall was revealed to be the most cited mathematics education researcher in the book, with 55 cites to his name (Gutiérrez & Boero, 2006).

Bibliography
 Advanced mathematical thinking. Edited by David Tall. Mathematics Education Library, 11. Kluwer Academic Publishers Group, Dordrecht, 1991.
 Stewart, Ian and Tall, David: Algebraic number theory. Second edition. Chapman and Hall Mathematics Series. Chapman & Hall, London, 1987. xx+262 pp. 
 Stewart, Ian and Tall, David: Algebraic number theory. Chapman and Hall Mathematics Series. Chapman and Hall, London; A Halsted Press Book, John Wiley & Sons, New York, 1979. xviii+257 pp. 
 Stewart, Ian and Tall, David: Algebraic number theory and Fermat's last theorem. Third edition. A K Peters, Ltd., Natick, MA, 2002. xx+313 pp. 
 Stewart, Ian and Tall, David: Complex analysis. The hitchhiker's guide to the plane. Cambridge University Press, Cambridge-New York, 1983. ix+290 pp. , 
 Tall, David: (2013). How Humans Learn to Think Mathematically: Exploring the Three Worlds of Mathematics (Learning in Doing: Social, Cognitive and Computational Perspectives). Cambridge: Cambridge University Press. doi:10.1017/CBO9781139565202

See also
Criticism of non-standard analysis

References

.
 Gutiérrez, A., & Boero, P. (Eds.).  (2006). Handbook of research on the psychology of mathematics education: Past, present and future. Rotterdam: Sense.
 Gray, E. & Tall, D. (1994) "Duality, Ambiguity, and Flexibility: A "Proceptual" View of Simple Arithmetic", Journal for Research in Mathematics Education 25(2) pp. 116–40. Available Online as PDF
 Tall, David; Vinner, Shlomo: "Concept image and concept definition in mathematics with particular reference to limits and continuity", Educational Studies in Mathematics, 12 (May, 1981), no. 2, 151–169.

20th-century British mathematicians
21st-century British mathematicians
Mathematics educators
Mathematical cognition researchers
1941 births
Living people
Academics of the University of Warwick